Babica is a village in the municipality of Kuršumlija, Serbia. According to the 2011 census, the village has a population of 61 inhabitants.

Population

References

Populated places in Toplica District